Milton Antonio Nunes Niemet (born November 13, 1966 in Sao Paulo), known as Zico, is a Brazilian football manager and former player. He came from Brazil to Mexican soccer in the middle of the 1991-1992 season for Puebla. He started in the youth team of the Flamengo Club.

References

1966 births
Living people
Brazilian football managers
Footballers from São Paulo
Brazilian footballers
Association footballers not categorized by position